Nweke is a surname. Notable people with the surname include:

Collins Nweke (born 1965), Belgian politician
Frank Nweke (born 1965), Nigerian politician
Grace Nweke, New Zealand netball player of Nigerian descent
, researcher

Surnames of African origin